Ledisi & Anibade Live Recordings Vol. 1 features live recording from singer, Ledisi and her band Anibade.

Track listing
"I Can Dig It" (Live from Joe's Pub)
"Just Don't Wanna Be Lonely" (Live from Blue Note)
"Autumn Leaves" (Live from Yoshi's)
"Good Lovin'" (Live from Blue Note)

References

Ledisi albums
2007 live albums